The Lahore Regional Cricket Association (known as the LRCA) is the governing body for cricket in Lahore, Punjab, Pakistan.

History
LRCA, formerly known as LCCA, was formed in the early 1950s. It has two grounds in Lahore: LCCA Ground hosts first-class matches, while Gaddafi Stadium hosts international matches.

It has fielded a number of Lahore teams in Pakistan's first-class, List A and T20 competitions.

LRCA Officials
Following are the members with their Phone numbers.
 President - Mr. Nadeem Ahmed President Lahore Regional/City Cricket Association 4-C/1, Gulberg III, Lahore Cell: 0321-9424444, 042-35874735 (Res)

Members
 Mirza Khurshid Uddin (0302-4087788)
 Arshad Khan (0333-4000911)

Social Media Presence 
Facebook: Official LRCA 

Twitter: OfficialLahore

Affiliations
The LRCA is affiliated with the Pakistan Cricket Board.

References

Cricket administration in Pakistan
Cricket in Lahore